The 2010 Istanbul Park GP3 Series round was a GP3 Series motor race held on May 29 and May 30, 2010, at the Istanbul Park in Istanbul, Turkey. It was the second race of the 2010 GP3 Series. The race was used to support the 2010 Turkish Grand Prix.

Classification

Qualifying

Notes
1. – Pablo Sánchez López, Stefano Coletti and Jim Pla  received a three-place grid penalty because of ignoring yellow flags. Michael Christensen was penalised for remaining on track after technical problems with car.

Feature Race

Sprint Race

Standings after the round

Drivers' Championship standings

Teams' Championship standings

 Note: Only the top five positions are included for both sets of standings.

See also 
 2010 Turkish Grand Prix
 2010 Istanbul Park GP2 Series round

External links
 GP3 Series official web site: Results

References

Istanbul Park
Istanbul Park GP3 Series round